On a Clear Day You Can See Forever is a musical with music by Burton Lane and a book and lyrics by Alan Jay Lerner based loosely on Berkeley Square, written in 1926 by John L. Balderston.  It concerns a woman who has ESP and has been reincarnated. The musical received three Tony Award nominations.

Productions
The Broadway production opened at the Mark Hellinger Theatre on October 17, 1965, and closed on June 11, 1966, after 280 performances and 3 previews. The production was directed by Robert Lewis, choreographed by Herbert Ross, and starred Barbara Harris as Daisy Gamble/Melinda, John Cullum as Dr. Mark Bruckner, Clifford David as Edward Moncrief, Titos Vandis as Themistocles Kriakos, and William Daniels (Harris's co-star in A Thousand Clowns) as Warren Smith. Louis Jourdan was the original leading man when the show had its tryout at the Colonial Theatre in Boston but was replaced by Cullum before it reached Broadway. Scenic design was by Oliver Smith and costume design was by Freddy Wittop.

The show was not well received. Ben Brantley of the New York Times recalled: "Its book was strained and muddled, most critics agreed; its big production numbers were simply cumbersome. But it did have [a] lushly melodic score...." Tours followed, starring such diverse actress-singers as Tammy Grimes, Linda Lavin, and Nancy Dussault as Daisy/Melinda.

A 1970 film adaptation directed by Vincente Minnelli starred Barbra Streisand, Yves Montand, Bob Newhart and Jack Nicholson.

In February 2000, the New York City Center Encores! series presented a staged concert starring Kristin Chenoweth as Daisy/Melinda and Peter Friedman as Dr. Bruckner.  The show premiered in London in 2000 at the Bridewell Theatre.

A revised Broadway production began previews on November 12, 2011, at the St. James Theatre and opened on December 11, 2011, directed by Michael Mayer and with a new book by Peter Parnell. Harry Connick Jr. starred as Dr. Mark Bruckner. The cast included Jessie Mueller as Melinda and David Turner as David Gamble.  The revised version, which had a developmental workshop at The Vineyard Theatre in the fall of 2009 and had readings in August 2010 at the Powerhouse Theater at Vassar College, departed from the plot of the original. The patient is now a gay florist David (Turner) who was a female jazz singer Melinda (Mueller) in a former life, and who falls in love with his psychiatrist, widower Dr. Mark Bruckner (Connick). The Vassar concert mixed "material from the stage and film versions and eliminates overstuffed 1960s-style production numbers." This production closed on January 29, 2012, after 29 previews and 57 performances.

On A Clear Day You Can See Forever was revived at the Union Theatre in London starring Vicki Lee Taylor as Daisy Gamble and Nadeem Crowe as Dr. Mark Bruckner. The production was directed by Kirk Jameson and opened to rave reviews with the run ending on 28 September 2013.

The 2011 revised Broadway version was revived at The New Conservatory Theater Center in San Francisco, California starring Chris Morell as David Gamble, Melissa O'Keefe as Melinda Wells, and popular local actor William Giammona as Dr. Mark Bruckner.  The production was directed by Artistic Director and Founder, Ed Decker, with music direction by Matthew Lee Cannon, choreography by Jayne Zaban and featuring new instrumental arrangements by Ben Prince.  It opened May 21, 2016.

Porchlight Music Theatre presented this show as a part of their "Porchlight Revisits" season where they stage three forgotten musicals per year. It was in Chicago, Illinois in May 2017. It was directed by Lili-Anne Brown.

Synopsis
Act I
Quirky Daisy Gamble sees herself as an unremarkable person and has low self-esteem, even though she can (1) make plants grow remarkably, (2) predict when a telephone will ring or someone will drop in, and (3) tell where to find an object that someone else is looking for.  Her current problem, though, is her nasty smoking habit, which will interfere with the chances of her fiancé, Warren, for a job with great benefits.  She seeks help from a psychiatrist, Dr. Mark Bruckner, to stop smoking.  When he hypnotizes her, she describes living a previous life in late 18th century England as "Melinda Wells", who died in her late twenties from circumstances beyond her control.  Free spirited Melinda was in love with portrait painter Edward Moncrief.  Mark keeps to himself what Daisy has revealed to him, and he tells her that she should not be ashamed of her ESP.

At their next session, Daisy, under hypnosis, relates scenes from the salacious London Hellrakers' Club where Melinda met Edward.  Melinda and Edward eventually marry, but the painter is unfaithful to her, making love to his subjects.  Mark finds himself falling for "Melinda" and becomes convinced that Daisy is really the reincarnation of Melinda.  Melinda finally leaves Edward and sets sail for America, but the ship never reaches Boston.  Before Mark can save Melinda from shipwreck, Daisy wakes up.

Act II
Mark reports on the case to his fellow psychiatrists, who ridicule his findings.  Greek shipping magnate Themistocles Kriakos learns of Mark's belief in reincarnation and offers to finance a study of the events of Melinda's life in exchange for Mark's help in discovering who he will be in his next life, which will allow him to leave his fortune to his future self.  Daisy accidentally discovers that she is the "Melinda" at the center of the growing controversy and that Mark prefers Melinda to herself.  In her angry confrontation with the psychiatrist about the matter, she tells him that she is "through being a go-between for you and your dream girl.  You're not going to go on using my head for a motel."

Daisy goes to the airport, ready to return home.  Her ESP powers warn her that the plane on which she plans to travel will crash.  She realizes at last how special she really is.  She leaves her starchy fiancé and she and Mark unite to explore their extraordinary future.

Versions
The musical is available in at least two noticeably different published versions (aside from the film version), although the basic plot-line remains the same.  The first version was published in 1966.  The musical numbers recorded in the original Broadway cast album of 1965 correspond to this version.

A second version is evident in the piano-vocal score published in 1967.  Here several vocal numbers from the above version are missing ("Ring Out the Bells," "Tosy and Cosh", "Don't Tamper with my Sister"), as is the introduction to the song "Hurry, It's Lovely Up Here," which is recorded on the cast album.  Also, the Greek millionaire's solo, "When I'm Being Born Again" is given completely different lyrics ("When I Come Around Again") and sung instead by Daisy's friends.  The overture recorded on the cast album combines the "overture" and "entr'acte" printed in the vocal score.

The 1970 film version departed from the musical significantly, adding a character for Jack Nicholson (an ex-stepbrother named "Tad"), and changing details of other characters, moving the period of Melinda's life ahead by a decade or two (into the early 19th century), removing several songs, changing lyrics and adding two new songs.

Songs

1965 Broadway version

Act I
"Overture"
"Hurry! It's Lovely Up Here!" — Daisy Gamble
"Ring Out the Bells" — Samuel Welles, Mrs. Welles, Sir Hubert Insdale and Servants
"Tosy and Cosh" — Daisy
"On a Clear Day (You Can See Forever)" — Dr. Mark Bruckner
"On the S.S. Bernard Cohn" — Daisy, Muriel Bunson, James Preston and Millard Cross
"At the Hellrakers" (Ballet)
"Don't Tamper with My Sister" — Edward Moncrief, Sir Hubert and Ensemble
"She Wasn't You" — Edward
"Melinda" — Dr. Bruckner

Act II
"When I'm Being Born Again" — Themistocles Kriakos
"What Did I Have That I Don't Have?" — Daisy
"Wait Till We're Sixty-Five" — Warren Smith and Daisy
"Come Back to Me" — Dr. Bruckner
"Come Back to Me (reprise)" — Dr. Bruckner
"On a Clear Day (You Can See Forever) (Reprise)" - Ensemble

1967 Revised version

Act I
"Overture"
"Hurry! It's Lovely Up Here!" — Daisy Gamble
"First Regression: She Wasn't You
"Solicitor's Song" — Samuel Welles, Mrs. Welles, Sir Hubert Insdale and Servants
"He Wasn't You" — Daisy
"On a Clear Day (You Can See Forever)" — Dr. Mark Bruckner
"The Gout"
"On the S.S. Bernard Cohn" — Daisy, Muriel Bunson, James Preston and Millard Cross
"She Wasn't You" — Edward
"Melinda" — Dr. Bruckner

Act II
"Entre´acte"
"When I'm Being Born Again" — Muriel, Preston and Students
"What Did I Have That I Don't Have?" — Daisy
"Wait Till We're Sixty-Five" — Warren Smith and Daisy
"Come Back to Me" — Dr. Bruckner
"Come Back to Me (reprise)" — Dr. Bruckner
"On a Clear Day (You Can See Forever) (Reprise)" - Ensemble

2011 Broadway revival version

Act I
"Overture"
"Hurry! It's Lovely Up Here!" 
"She Isn't You" 
"Open Your Eyes" †
"Wait 'til We're 65" 
"You're All the World to Me" †
"Who Is There Among Us Who Knows"
"On the S.S. Bernard Cohn" 
"Love with All the Trimmings"
"Melinda" 

Act II
"Entr' Acte"
"Go to Sleep" - Added during previews, not credited in the Playbill
"Ev'ry Night at Seven" †
"Too Late Now" †
"When I'm Being Born Again"
"He Wasn't You" 
"What Did I Have That I Don't Have"
"Come Back to Me"
"On a Clear Day (You Can See Forever)"

† Songs taken from the musical film Royal Wedding.

Note: In the piano-vocal score, a song appears that was not included in the original Broadway production: "The Solicitor's Song", during Daisy's first regression-scene. There was also a ballet in the first act of the original production, entitled "At the Hellrakers" and the song "Ring Out the Bells" that are not found on the original Broadway recording.

Recordings
The title song, first introduced by John Cullum in the 1965 musical, has been recorded by a number of artists, including Robert Goulet, Johnny Mathis, baseball pitcher Denny McLain, and Sergio Franchi on his 1976 DynaHouse and TeleHouse albums; Barbra Streisand, star of the 1970 film version, recorded the title song on the film's soundtrack and has frequently included it in her concerts. Sammy Davis Jr. has also performed the title song live in concert, and Harry James released a version in 1967 on his album Our Leader! (Dot DLP 3801 and DLP 25801). In 2012, The Peddlers' 1968 jazz cover was used in season 5 episode 3 ("Hazard Pay") of AMC-TV's Breaking Bad over a montage of Walt and Jesse's meth manufacturing.

"What Did I Have That I Don't Have" was covered with some success by Eydie Gorme and was also sung by Streisand on the soundtrack of the film version. "Come Back to Me" was recorded by swing revival band the Cherry Poppin' Daddies in 1994, which later appeared on their multi-platinum 1997 compilation Zoot Suit Riot and was re-recorded for their 2014 Rat Pack tribute Please Return the Evening.

The title song is reminiscent of Ravel's "Dawn" movement from his ballet Daphnis et Chloé.

Awards and nominations

Original Broadway production

2011 Broadway revival

References

External links
Internet Broadway Database
Profile of the musical at guidetomusicaltheatre.com
Piano Solo "On a Clear Day" played by Roger Williams, from the Pianocorder Contemporary Artists Series, (7 ft Grand Piano)

1965 musicals
Broadway musicals
Musicals by Alan Jay Lerner
Cultural depictions of George IV
Musicals based on plays
Plays set in New York City
Fiction about reincarnation